Maria Eduarda Miccuci (born 7 June 1995) is a Brazilian synchronized swimmer. She competed in the women's duet at the 2016 Summer Olympics.

References

1995 births
Living people
Brazilian synchronized swimmers
Olympic synchronized swimmers of Brazil
Synchronized swimmers at the 2016 Summer Olympics
Place of birth missing (living people)
Synchronized swimmers at the 2015 Pan American Games
Artistic swimmers at the 2019 Pan American Games
Pan American Games competitors for Brazil
Artistic swimmers at the 2019 World Aquatics Championships
21st-century Brazilian women